The A Line (formerly the University of Colorado A Line for sponsorship reasons) is a Regional Transportation District (RTD) commuter rail line serving Denver and Aurora, Colorado, operating between downtown Denver and Denver International Airport (DIA). During planning and construction, it was also known as the East Rail Line, but most locals refer to it as the A Line. Despite its former title, the line does not serve the campuses of the University of Colorado.

History
Mass transit has been under consideration for the corridor between Downtown Denver and Denver International Airport since the latter was proposed in the 1980s. The project gathered momentum in 1997 when a Major Investment Study was completed for the corridor, encouraging fixed-guideway mass transit (light rail or commuter rail), highway widening and general improvements. The project was approved as part of the FasTracks transit expansion package in November 2004, went through regulatory processes and was approved by the Federal Transit Administration in November 2009. In July 2007, it was decided to use electric instead of diesel propulsion over speed and air pollution concerns.

RTD designated the line with the letter “A”, denoting service to the airport and Aurora. Groundbreaking for the A Line was held on August 26, 2010. As the second line of RTD's FasTracks expansion plan, the East Corridor was constructed and operated under the Eagle P3 public–private partnership. The first electric multiple unit railcars were pulled along the route on April 3, 2015, commencing testing and commissioning of the line.

Revenue service began on April 22, 2016. A software problem in the equipment closing the crossing gates has resulted in the use of traffic guards and frequent delays since the opening, earning the project a slot on Westword's 2016 Colorado Hall of Shame.

Since the A line's opening in April 2016, it has had a number of operational issues. The main issue is with the crossing gate technology. Crossing arms have been coming down too early and staying down too long, causing traffic backups. Today, RTD is making progress in fixing the crossing gate timing system along the A Line. The A Line shares crossings with Union Pacific tracks. This adds complexity to the crossing gate programs and technology.

In June 2018, the FRA approved a plan to remove the flaggers monitoring the crossing gates along the A Line. This approval also allows local jurisdictions to submit requests to the FRA to establish "quiet zones", removing the need for trains crossing through the gates to blow their horns. As of February 2019, approval for "quiet zones" at nine of the line's crossings has been granted, to be in effect on March 1, 2019.

Route
The A Line route follows and remains within a mile of Interstate 25, Interstate 70, and the airport access highway (Peña Boulevard). The line makes use of a preexisting Union Pacific Railroad right-of-way along the portion of the route from downtown Denver heading east, then deviates to the north along Peña Boulevard in a newly created right-of-way. Peña Boulevard was designed with an extra-wide median between its inbound and outbound lanes that could have been used for rail transit, though ultimately the East Rail Corridor alignment was offset from the highway right-of-way.

Leaving Union Station the line follows the Union Pacific corridor past Coors Field to reach a station at 38th and Blake Streets shared with the future Central Corridor expansion. From there the line turns east alongside 40th Avenue past the Denver Union Pacific Intermodal Yard. Just east of Josephine Street the corridor turns two blocks north then east again to stay along the Union Pacific corridor to reach the 40th Avenue and Colorado Boulevard station. After passing under Colorado Boulevard the line parallels Smith Road, with a station at Central Park Boulevard in the redevelopment area of the decommissioned Stapleton International Airport. Shortly after entering Aurora, the line reaches a station at Peoria Street, which is shared with the R Line. Continuing east, alongside Smith Road, the line passes under Peoria Street and then Interstate 225. Just west of Airport Boulevard, the line rises on a viaduct curving north over the Union Pacific tracks, Airport Boulevard, 32nd Avenue, and Interstate 70. Having left the Union Pacific corridor, the viaduct then descends to a station at the existing Park and Ride at 40th Avenue and Airport Boulevard. From there the line reenters Denver, following the east side of Peña Boulevard. North of 56th Avenue it enters an added to the line construction Peña Boulevard station at 61st Avenue. The line continues north and east, parallel to Peña Boulevard and crossing over E-470. Turning north, the line crosses over Peña Boulevard adjacent to DIA runway 7/25 and then runs east between the airport secure area and 78th Avenue. The line then crosses over the south/west terminal exit lanes of Peña Boulevard ending at a station on the south side of the DIA Hotel and Transit Center, itself at the south end of the DIA Jeppesen Terminal.

Stations

References

External links

 

RTD commuter rail
Transportation in Aurora, Colorado
Airport rail links in the United States
25 kV AC railway electrification
Railway lines opened in 2016